Habib Allah Dahmani (born October 16, 1993 in Oujda) is a Moroccan footballer who plays as a forward.

References

External links
 

1993 births
Living people
Moroccan footballers
Moroccan expatriate footballers
MC Oujda players
Al-Orouba SC players
Al-Seeb Club players
Chabab Atlas Khénifra players
KAC Kénitra players
Fath Union Sport players
Muaither SC players
Ittihad Tanger players
Botola players
Oman Professional League players
Qatari Second Division players
Expatriate footballers in Oman
Expatriate footballers in Qatar
Moroccan expatriate sportspeople in Oman
Moroccan expatriate sportspeople in Qatar
Association football forwards